Lorenzo Giovanchelli (born 19 July 1986) is an Italian rugby union player. His usual position is as a Hooker, and he currently plays for I Medicei.

From 2014 to 2015, he played for Zebre as an Additional Player.

In 2006 Giovanchelli was named in the Italy Under 21 squad.

References

External links 
Eurosport Profile
It's Rugby France Profile

Italian rugby union players
Petrarca Rugby players
Zebre Parma players
1986 births
Living people
Rugby union hookers
Rugby Club I Medicei players
Cavalieri Prato players
Rugby Calvisano players